Upsalquitch is an unincorporated community in Restigouche County, New Brunswick, Canada. 
The town is located in the northern part of the province, near the Quebec border, south of Route 17.

Upsalquitch comes from the Mi'kmaq word Apsětkwĕchk which means "small river."

History

Notable people

See also
List of communities in New Brunswick

Robinsonville, Squaw Cap, Dawsonville, Glencoe, Glenlevit, Flatlands.

References

Communities in Restigouche County, New Brunswick